Normal map may refer to:
Normal mapping in 3D computer graphics 
Normal invariants in mathematical surgery theory
Normal matrix in linear algebra 
Normal operator in functional analysis